Lawson Robinson (born October 19, 1986) is an Antiguan footballer who currently plays for Antigua Barracuda FC in the USL Professional Division and the Antigua and Barbuda national team.

Club career
Robinson began his professional career in 2004 with Hoppers in the Antigua and Barbuda Premier Division, and helped the team win the CTV Warriors' Cup in 2005. He went on to play for Empire and All Saints United.

In 2011 Robinson transferred to the new Antigua Barracuda FC team prior to its first season in the USL Professional Division. He made his debut for the Barracudas in their first competitive game on April 17, 2011, a 2-1 loss to the Los Angeles Blues.

International career
Robinson made his debut for the Antigua and Barbuda national team in 2010, and has since gone on to make four appearances for his country. He was part of the Antigua squad which took part in the final stages of the 2010 Caribbean Championship.

National team statistics

International goals
Scores and results list Antigua and Barbuda' goal tally first.

References

External links

1986 births
Living people
Antigua and Barbuda footballers
Antigua Barracuda F.C. players
USL Championship players
Antigua and Barbuda international footballers
Association football midfielders